Vahid Ghelich and also Qlich born on December 16, 1957, in Tehran is a retired Iranian footballer. He was Persepolis Goalkeeper for more than a decade. During his career he played for Persepolis and Poora. He is the  most capped Goalkeeper in the Persepolis history for 12 years. He has also been in the Iran national football team. Vahid Ghelich has played about 180 games for Persepolis. He has saved 4 important penalties in the matches of perspolis vs. Esteghlal. In 2 matches against the blue team his jaw was broken and in another match, his fingers were broken as a biased goal keeper.

He started his senior career at Persepolis and is considered to be a member of a Golden Generation of players at the club. He remained there for 12 years before moving to Poora.

After retirement, he became perspolis goal keepers' coach in 2000 .
 He has also found the good  talent and introduced Alireza Haghighi, the recent Iran national football team goal keeper to Iran's football in the new generation.

References

https://www.tabnak.ir/fa/news/924888/تو-پنالتی-رونالدو-را-گرفتی-من-پنالتی-قلعه-نویی-را-

1957 births
Living people
Iranian footballers
Iran international footballers
Persepolis F.C. players
1992 AFC Asian Cup players
Persepolis F.C. non-playing staff
Association football goalkeepers